GrimSkunk Plays... Fatal Illness is a compilation album of rerecorded songs by the Canadian rock group, GrimSkunk, from their early days when known as Fatal Illness. It was released in 2001.

Track listing 
You're Just Like Oscar
Rick Loves His Window
Poser Punk
Don't Hide
A-Type
No More Life
Lord Ogre
Race's Flaw
Final Tale
Dead Mutant
Go
Faces On You
Insane
NPC
Human Blender
Fat Al's Illness
Power Word Kill
Rooftop Killer

External links 
Bande à part profile

GrimSkunk albums
2001 albums
Indica Records albums